House Resolution 2796 (HR 2796, The Civil Rights Uniformity Act of 2017) is a bill in the United States House of Representatives that was introduced on June 7, 2017 by Representative Pete Olson [R-TX-22] and originally cosponsored by Reps. Brian Babin [R-TX-36], Ralph Lee Abraham [R-LA-5], and Vicky Hartzler [R-MO-4]. The proposed legislation would prohibit the interpretation of the word "sex" or "gender" to include "gender identity," and would require the terms "man" or "woman" to refer exclusively to a person's biologically-assigned gender in the interpretation of federal civil rights laws, federal administrative agency regulations, and federal guidance. The bill has attracted five additional cosponsors since its introduction.

Overview
According to the bill summary,

Rep. Pete Olson stated "The Founding Fathers never intended unelected bureaucrats in federal agencies to make sweeping changes to the definition of gender."

HR 5812, a bill containing nearly identical text and co-sponsored by many of the same Representatives (in addition to Reps. The National Center for Transgender Equality did not recommend any action on HR 2796, as it was also likely to die in committee.

Actions

Sponsors

 Pete Olson [R-TX-22], sponsor (also sponsored HR 5812)
 Brian Babin [R-TX-36], original co-sponsor (also co-sponsored HR 5812)
 Ralph Lee Abraham [R-LA-5], original co-sponsor
 Vicky Hartzler [R-MO-4], original co-sponsor (also co-sponsored HR 5812)
 Trent Franks [R-AZ-8], co-sponsor 
 Steve King [R-IA-4], co-sponsor 
 Walter B. Jones Jr. [R-NC-3], co-sponsor 
 Louie Gohmert [R-TX-1], co-sponsor 
 Glenn Grothman [R-WI-6], co-sponsor  (also co-sponsored HR 5812)
 Raúl Labrador [R-ID-1], co-sponsor

Bill Text
A BILL
To repeal executive overreach, to clarify that the proper constitutional authority for social transformation belongs to the legislative branch.

Be it enacted by the Senate and House of Representatives of the United States of America in Congress assembled,
SECTION 1. SHORT TITLE.

This Act may be cited as the “Civil Rights Uniformity Act of 2017”.

SEC. 2. CONGRESSIONAL FINDINGS AND DECLARATION OF PURPOSE.

SEC. 3. PROHIBITION OF POLICIES REDEFINING SEX TO MEAN GENDER IDENTITY.

See also

 Transgender disenfranchisement in the United States
 Identity documents in the United States
 History of transgender people in the United States
 LGBT rights in the United States
 Intersex rights in the United States
 Transgender rights
 Name change
 List of transgender-related topics

References

External links
 
 

Proposed legislation of the 115th United States Congress
LGBT rights in the United States
Transgender law in the United States
United States proposed federal LGBT legislation
2017 in LGBT history